The Bréguet Bre.4, also known variously as the Type IV and BUM, was a French biplane bomber of World War I. A fighter version of it was also produced as the BUC and BLC; some of these saw service with the British Royal Navy, which called them 'the Bréguet 'de Chasse.

Design and development
The Bre.4 was developed during 1914 when French military planners began to express a preference for pusher- over tractor-configured aircraft, leading Bréguet Aviation to cease further development of its original Type IV design and pursue military contracts with an aircraft of the preferred layout. The Type IV was a two-bay, equal-span, unstaggered biplane that seated the pilot and observer in tandem open cockpits in a nacelle that also carried the pusher engine at its rear, and the tricycle undercarriage.

As the prototype neared completion, the Bréguet factory at La Brayelle, Douai was threatened by the advancing German Army, and the machine and its builders were evacuated to Villacoublay where construction and testing were completed. At this point, André and Édouard Michelin approached the French government with an offer to sponsor the construction of 100 bombers for the French Army, and were awarded a licence for the Bréguet design. This was put into production as the BUM (B for pusher-driven, U for Canton-Unné-powered, M for Michelin). A later revised version, the BLM, was the definitive Renault-powered version.

Soon after the BUM entered service, the French Army requested that an escort fighter version be developed to protect the bombers from interception. Bréguet responded with a lightened design armed with a 37 mm (1.46 in) Hotchkiss cannon, intended to pick off enemy fighters before they closed to within range of their machine guns. This entered production as the BUC (C for chasse, or pursuit) in its original Canton-Unné powered version and BLC in its Renault version.

Operational history

French service
Few of the BUC and BLC escort fighters were built, as their performance and utility were discovered to be lacking, and the doctrine of the cannon-armed escort fighter was soon abandoned in favour of countering fighters with other similar fighters.

Royal Naval Air Service
Bréguet built 17 BUC/BLCs for the British Royal Navy's Royal Naval Air Service using British  Sunbeam Mohawk engines. The Royal Navy called them the Bréguet de Chasse. They served alongside Caudron G.4s with No. 5 Wing RNAS – the Royal Navys first air unit specifically trained for long-range bombing – in Belgium from April to June 1916.

Variants
Type IV (BU.3)
Bréguet prototype.

BUM (BrM 2B.2)
Michelin-built, Canton-Unné-powered bomber version.

BLM (BrM 4B.2)
Michelin-built, Renault-powered bomber version.

BUC
Michelin-built, Canton-Unné-powered escort fighter version.

BLC
Michelin-built, Renault-powered escort fighter version.Bréguet de ChasseVersion of BLC for RNAS, powered by Sunbeam Mohawk or Rolls-Royce Falcon engine.

Operators

French Air Force

Romanian Air Corps

Royal Naval Air Service
No. 5 Wing RNAS

Specifications (BUC)

References

Notes

Bibliography

 Taylor, John W. R. and Jean Alexander. Combat Aircraft of the World. New York: G.P. Putnam's Sons, 1969. . 
 Taylor, Michael J. H. Jane's Encyclopedia of Aviation. London: Studio Editions, 1989. .
 Thetford, Owen. British Naval Aircraft Since 1912, Sixth Edition. Annapolis, Maryland: Naval Institute Press, 1991. .
 World Aircraft Information Files.'' London: Bright Star Publishing, File 890. Sheets 78–79.

 0004
1910s French bomber aircraft
Single-engined pusher aircraft
Biplanes
Aircraft first flown in 1914